Kiss the Sky may refer to:

 Kiss the Sky (film), a 1998 film directed by Roger Young
 Kiss the Sky, a music duo formed by Paul Hardcastle and Jaki Graham, or their 1991 album
 Kiss the Sky (Jimi Hendrix album), 1984
 Kiss the Sky (Tatyana Ali album) or the title song, 1998
 Kiss the Sky, an album by Claude Hay, 2007
 "Kiss the Sky" (song), by Jason Derulo, 2016
 "Kiss the Sky", a song by Cash Cash
 "Kiss the Sky", a song by the Knocks from 55, 2016
 "Kiss the Sky", a song by Machine Gun Kelly from Bloom, 2017
 "Kiss the Sky", a song by Shawn Lee